The 1913 Saskatchewan Huskies football team represented the University of Saskatchewan in Canadian football. This was their inaugural season and technically represented the College of Arts and Science.

Schedule

References

Saskatchewan Huskies football seasons
1913 in Canadian football
Saskatchewan Huskies football